Daphne Etta Maxwell Reid (née Maxwell; July 13, 1948) is an American actress, comedian, designer and former model. She is best known for her role as the second Vivian Banks on the NBC sitcom The Fresh Prince of Bel-Air from 1993 to 1996.

Early life
Reid was born in New York City, the daughter of Rosalee and Green Maxwell. She is a graduate of The Bronx High School of Science. She received a degree in interior design and architecture from Northwestern University, which she attended on a scholarship and where she became the first African-American woman to be named homecoming queen. While at Northwestern she began a modeling career, eventually signing with the Eileen Ford modeling agency. She was the first black woman to be on the cover of Glamour magazine.

Career

She has appeared in numerous television programs. Her best-known role was as the replacement actress for Vivian Banks on the NBC sitcom The Fresh Prince of Bel-Air from 1993 to 1996, following the departure of Janet Hubert-Whitten. She joined the show right after the fictional character Nicky Banks was born toward the end of Season 3, when Hubert-Whitten did not renew her contract.

Before that role, she starred in several television series including, Simon & Simon, Frank’s Place, and Snoops.

She had a recurring role as JT's mother, Frances Hunter, on the UPN sitcom Eve, and then played Juanita Lawrence on the BET sitcom Let's Stay Together.

Reid is also an accomplished photographer as well as a designer and clothing creator.

During the 1980s and 1990s, Reid served on the advisory board of the National Student Film Institute.

She is a recipient of the Women of Vision Award from Women in Film & Video, among a myriad of other awards.

In 2022, she guest stars in the ninth episode of Bel-Air, the dramatic reimagining of Fresh Prince, as Helen, an Art Council board member.

Personal life

In 1968, during her junior year at Northwestern, Maxwell married Robert Tubbs. They had one son, Chris, before divorcing in 1979.

She married actor Tim Reid in 1982, and became stepmother to his two children. With Reid, she owned and operated New Millennium Studios in Petersburg, Virginia, until 2014.

She also served on the board of visitors at Virginia State University, for eight years. She was appointed in July 2008.

On July 31, 2010, she became an honorary member of Delta Sigma Theta sorority, during their 50th national convention in New Orleans.

Filmography

Film

Television

Music videos

References

External links

1948 births
20th-century American actresses
21st-century American actresses
Actresses from New York City
African-American actresses
African-American female models
African-American models
American female models
American film actresses
American television actresses
Delta Sigma Theta members
Living people
Northwestern University alumni
The Bronx High School of Science alumni
20th-century African-American women
20th-century African-American people
21st-century African-American women
21st-century African-American people